The Rudekšna is a river of Kėdainiai district municipality, Kaunas County, central Lithuania.

It starts nearby the Gružai Forest, on the Ukmergė District Municipality and Panevėžys District Municipality limits. The Rudekšna flows southwards and meets the Obelis river (from the right side) nearby Runeikiai village. Pagiriai town stands by the Rudekšna.
 

References

Rivers of Lithuania
Kėdainiai District Municipality